John M Shifflett (March 22, 1953 – April 27, 2017) was an American jazz musician, player of the double bass and also an arranger, composer, and educator, with his last teaching job at San Jose State University.

Shifflett was born in Dubuque, Iowa, attended High-School at Dubuque where he played trombone and began playing bass (see at Sing Out Dubuque, John Shifflett playing his own composition on bass, January 8th 1971), and graduated in 1976 with a BS degree from Iowa State University. While at the University of Iowa, where he was working on a master's degree, Shifflett was its big band and its jazz combo bass player, appearing at festivals such as the Notre Dame Collegiate Jazz Festivals in April 1979 and in March 1980.

Shifflett moved to San Jose in 1987, as his wife Bethany was offered a tenure-track position at San Jose State University.

Shifflett played in several notable acts, including Frankie Avalon, the Ringling Bros. and Barnum & Bailey Circus, the American Musical Theatre of San Jose, Dinah Shore, Mel Torme, Jerry Lewis, Dionne Warwick and the Smothers Brothers.

Discography

With Anton Schwartz
2014: Flash Mob (Double bass)
2008: Radiant Blue (Double bass)
2000: The Slow Lane (Double bass)
1998: When Music Calls (Double bass)

With Audrey Martin
2014: Living Room (Double bass)

With Gabriela Mendes
2012: Um Renovo Musical (Double bass)

With Jim Norton Collective
2013: TIME REMEMBERED: COMPOSITIONS OF BILL EVANS (Double bass)

With John Stowell/Michael Zilber
2015: Basement Blues (Double bass)
2012: Live Beauty (Double bass)
2009: SHOT THROUGH WITH BEAUTY (Double bass)

With Christian Tamburr 
 2011: Places (Double Bass)

With Juliet Green
2014: Think About That (Double bass)
2003: Simple (Double bass)

With Larry Dunlap
2002: Fly With My Love (Double bass)

With Kristen Strom
2012: Sojourn (Double bass)
2005: Intention (Double bass)

With Aaron Lington Quintet
2005: Cape Breton (Double bass)

With Laurie Antonioli
2010: American Dreams (Double Bass)
2013: SONGS OF SHADOW, SONGS OF LIGHT (Double bass)

With Michael Zilber
2010: BILLY COLLINS PROJECT: ELEVEN ON TURNING TEN (Double bass)

With Michael Zilber and Dave Liebman
2003: Live At The Jazzschool (Double bass)

With NLS Trio
1999: NLS Trio  (Double bass)

With Paul Tynan & Aaron Lington
 2010: BICOASTAL COLLECTIVE: CHAPTER TWO (Double bass)
 2009: BICOASTAL COLLECTIVE: CHAPTER ONE (Double bass)

With Patrick Cress' Telepathy
2005: Meditation, Realization (Double bass)

With Sandra Marlowe
 2016: A Sweet Wind (Double bass) 
 2012: True Blue (Double bass)

With Scott Sorkin

With Thomas G. Leslie/ UNLV Wind Orchestra
2013: Lost Vegas (Double bass)

References

External links
John Shifflett OA2 records website

1953 births
People from Dubuque, Iowa
American jazz double-bassists
Male double-bassists
Musicians from Iowa
University of Iowa alumni
2017 deaths
Deaths from pancreatic cancer
Deaths from cancer in California
American male jazz musicians